In Aztec mythology, Chalchiuhtotolin (Nahuatl for "Jade Turkey") was a god of disease and plague. Chalchihuihtotolin, the Jewelled Fowl, Tezcatlipoca's nahual. Chalchihuihtotolin is a symbol of powerful sorcery. Tezcatlipoca can tempt humans into self-destruction, but when he takes the form of a female turkey he can also cleanse them of contamination, absolve them of guilt, and overcome their fate. In the tonalpohualli, Chalchihuihtotolin rules over day Tecpatl (Stone Knife) and over trecena 1-Atl (Water). 

The preceding thirteen days are ruled over by Xolotl. Chalchihuihtotolin has a particularly evil side to her. Even though she is shown with the customary green feathers, most codices show him bent over and with black/white eyes, which is a sign reserved for evil gods such as Tezcatlipoca, Mictlantecuhtli, and Xolotl. Another depiction of Chalchiuhtotolin's evil side includes the sharp silver of her talons. Her nahual is a turkey in which he terrorizes villages, bringing disease and sickness.

References

Aztec gods